Belmond Hiram Bingham is a luxury train operating day return trips from Poroy station outside Cusco to Aguas Calientes, the station for Machu Picchu in Peru.

The train, named after Hiram Bingham, who rediscovered the largely forgotten Inca city of Machu Picchu, travels from the high Andes down the Sacred Valley, and for much of the journey it runs alongside the Urubamba River.

The train consists of two dining cars, a bar car and an observation car with an open deck. Passengers have brunch on the outbound journey and dinner on the return. Passengers can sample the local Peruvian pisco drink in the bar car and there is a live local band on board.

Belmond Hiram Bingham was launched in 1999 by Lorenzo Sousa owner and President of Peru Rail SA jointly with Orient-Express Hotels, when the company began operating PeruRail services in a 50:50 venture with Peruvian Trains and Railways, and three hotels (now increased to six 2017) in Peru.

Belmond Hiram Bingham Cars

References

External links 
 
Belmond.com

Tourism in Peru